Gourin is a commune in the Morbihan département of Brittany in north-western France.

Geography

Historically, it belongs to Cornouaille. Gourin is on the southern slope of the Montagnes Noires (French, Black Mountains). The river Inam rises in the northern part of Gourin and flows to the south.

Map

Demographics
Inhabitants of Gourin are called in French Gourinois. Gourin continues to lose a lot of inhabitants.

History

This small town is well known for the Révolte des Bonnets Rouges against local nobles at the end of the 17th century. The town is also known for being the origin of many immigrants to United States and Canada during the first part of the 20th century.  It has a large copy of the Statue of  Liberty standing in the main square opposite the town hall alongside the monument to the fallen  soldiers of the 20th century who came from this region.

Gourin still has a large number of native Breton speakers. The people of this region are very proud of their Celtic heritage and have preserved many old customs and traditions.

thumb|center| Place Stenfort in Gourin at the beginning of the twentieth century.

Breton language
In 2008, 18.32% of primary school children attended bilingual schools.

People
 Georges Cochevelou, father of the Breton musician, Alan Stivell, was from Gourin

Twinning 

Gourin is twinned with the following place:
 Rush, Leinster, Ireland

Gallery

See also
Communes of the Morbihan department
Listing of the works of the atelier of the Maître de Tronoën
List of the works of the Maître de Lanrivain

References

External links

Official website

art movies Gourin 
English guide to Gourin 
 Mayors of Morbihan Association 

Communes of Morbihan